Hon. Elizabeth Ponsonby (28 December 190031 July 1940) was an English aristocrat who was a prominent member of the Bright Young Things, well-connected socialites who featured heavily in the contemporary tabloid press for what were perceived to be their hedonistic antics.

The daughter of Arthur Ponsonby, Secretary of State for Foreign Affairs, later created Baron Ponsonby of Shulbrede, Elizabeth was born at 9 Victoria Square, London. She descended from the Ponsonby Earls of Bessborough. Her mother, Dolly (1876–1963), was daughter of the composer Hubert Parry. David Plunket Greene was her cousin.

Alongside Babe Plunket-Greene, Brian Howard and Edward Gathorne-Hardy, Ponsonby was considered to be one of the leaders of the group. Her father was displeased by her notoriety, commenting "I think she is made for better things" and regretting that she was "famous for her extravagant pranks".

Her 1929 marriage to (John) Denis Cavendish Pelly, an assistant in a Bond Street gramophone shop later employed by the Gaslight and Coke Company, son of Major William Francis Henry Pelly of the Royal Inniskilling Fusiliers and descendant of Sir John Pelly, 1st Baronet, was dissolved in 1933, and Ponsonby later entered a relationship with garage proprietor John Ludovic ('Ludy') Ford. She died in 1940, according to her brother, Matthew, of alcoholism.

Ponsonby was a model for Agatha Runcible in Evelyn Waugh's novel Vile Bodies.

References 

1900 births
1940 deaths
20th-century English women
20th-century English people
Alcohol-related deaths in England
British socialites
Daughters of barons
Elizabeth